Teinoptila clavata is a moth of the family Yponomeutidae. It is found in Guangxi, China.

The wingspan is 15–16 mm.

Etymology
The specific name is from the Latin clavatus, referring to the clavate sacculus in the male genitalia.

External links
Taxonomic study of the genus Teinoptila Sauber, 1902 from China (Lepidoptera: Yponomeutidae)

Yponomeutidae